Kurese Landscape Conservation Area is a nature park situated in Pärnu County, Estonia.

Its area is 525 ha.

The protected area was designated in 1976 to protect Salumägi Hill and its surrounding areas. In 2007, the protected area was redesigned to the landscape conservation area.

References

Nature reserves in Estonia
Geography of Pärnu County